NGC 7259 is a spiral galaxy approximately 66 million light-years away from Earth in the constellation of Piscis Austrinus. It was discovered by John Herschel on September 28, 1834.

Supernova SN 2009ip 
In 2009, a possible supernova was detected within the galaxy, and was designated SN 2009ip. Since the brightness faded in a matter of days, it was redesignated as a luminous blue variable (LBV) supernova impostor.
During the following years several luminous outbursts were detected from SN 2009ip. In September 2012 SN 2009ip was classified as a young type IIn supernova.

See also 
 List of NGC objects (7001–7840)
 Piscis Austrinus (constellation)

References

External links 

 
 SEDS

Spiral galaxies
Piscis Austrinus
7259
68718
Astronomical objects discovered in 1834
Discoveries by John Herschel